Callicarpa maingayi is a species of beautyberry plant in the family Lamiaceae. It is found in Malaysia and Singapore.

References

maingayi
Least concern plants
Taxonomy articles created by Polbot